The 2009 Victory Road was a professional wrestling pay-per-view (PPV) event produced by Total Nonstop Action Wrestling (TNA), which took place on July 19, 2009, at the TNA Impact! Zone in Orlando, Florida. It was the fifth event under the Victory Road chronology and was voted the worst major wrestling show of the year by the Wrestling Observer Newsletter.

In October 2017, with the launch of the Global Wrestling Network, the event became available to stream on demand.

Storylines

Victory Road featured nine professional wrestling matches that involved different wrestlers from pre-existing scripted feuds and storylines. Wrestlers portrayed villains, heroes, or less distinguishable characters in the scripted events that built tension and culminated in a wrestling match or series of matches.

At Slammiversary, TNA's preceding pay per view, Kurt Angle won the TNA World Heavyweight Championship, and subsequently reclaimed his position as leader of the villainous alliance, The Main Event Mafia. Former champion and executive shareholder of the company, Mick Foley, decided to get a rematch for the title at Victory Road.

To appease Angle in getting his match, Foley also gave Main Event Mafia member, Kevin Nash, a match for the TNA Legends Championship against A.J. Styles; he also had created a chance for two other members of the Mafia in Booker T and Scott Steiner to challenge Beer Money, Inc. (the name of the tag team of Robert Roode and James Storm) for the TNA World Tag Team Championship, which they received their chance following their victory over Team 3D (Brother Devon and Brother Ray).

After allowing Angle to win the TNA World Heavyweight Championship at Slammiversary, Samoa Joe was initiated into the Main Event Mafia at the expense of its former leader, Sting, which was represented by the Mafia beating down on Sting the edition of Impact! following the show. After weeks of confrontation between Joe and Sting, it was announced on the July 9 edition of Impact! that the two would face each other at Victory Road.

Abyss had been seeing a psychiatrist for months in the form of Dr. Stevie in an attempt to overcome his sadistic desires; it came to light eventually that Stevie was physically and mentally abusing his patient and controlling him with stun guns and drugs, eventually recruiting associates (Raven and Daffney) to aid him in controlling Abyss in similar fashion, as well as threatening Abyss's love interest, Lauren Brooke. The provocation continued, and on the July 16 edition of Impact!, it was announced Abyss would face Stevie.

Reception
The Wrestling Observer newsletter ranked TNA Victory Road 2009 the worst major wrestling show of 2009. Figure Four Weekly webmaster Bryan Alvarez said on the July 19, 2009 edition of "The Bryan and Vinny Show" that he could not rate any match above two and a half stars, and was critical of the finish to the Beer Money vs. Booker T and Scott Steiner match saying that referee Earl Hebner should not be able to get into a ring faster than James Storm. Alvarez saved his harshest criticism for the Jenna/Sharmell match; not only did he give it a minus five star rating and call it the worst women's match he had ever seen, he said he had been unable to remember the last time he had done so because it had been so long since he had seen a match that bad.

Results

References

External links
TNAwrestling.com (Official Website of TNA Wrestling)
TNAVictoryRoad.com (Official Website of TNA Wrestling's "Victory Road" Pay-Per-View)

Impact Wrestling Victory Road
Professional wrestling in Orlando, Florida
July 2009 events in the United States
2009 in professional wrestling in Florida
2009 Total Nonstop Action Wrestling pay-per-view events
Events in Orlando, Florida